The Glen Chalk Caves, Bury St Edmunds is a  biological Site of Special Scientific Interest in Bury St Edmunds in Suffolk.

Tunnels totalling 200 metres in length radiate from a chalk pit which also contains a disused lime kiln, and the tunnels and kiln are used by five species of bat for hibernation between September and April, and the surrounding vegetation helps to maintain a suitable micro-climate in the caves. The principal species are Daubenton's, Natterer's and brown long-eared bats.

The caves are in an area maintained as a nature reserve off Mount Road.

References

Sites of Special Scientific Interest in Suffolk